East Islip is a hamlet and CDP in the Town of Islip, Suffolk County, New York, United States. At the time of the 2010 census, the CDP had a population of 14,475.

History and overview
Originally referred to as "East of Islip", the name was acquired in 1890 from the estate of William Nicoll, an English aristocrat who purchased the surrounding land in 1683 to erect a family residence. Nicoll's purchase comprised  from the Secatogue Indians, reaching as far as Bayport to the east, Babylon to the west and Ronkonkoma to the north. His mansion, Islip Grange, named after his family's ancestral estate at Northampshire, England, stood near the shoreline of what is now Heckscher State Park.

East Islip, as well as many hamlets along Long Island's south shore, was once an enclave for some of the nation's wealthiest families. Its estates at one time included the Hollins, Gulden, and Knapp estates, among others. An original estate mansion, Brookwood Hall, has passed from its last private owners, the Thorne family (originally of Great Neck during the Dutch colonial era) and now serves as a municipal building for the Town of Islip. The Sullivan estate became the home of the Hewlett School, a private boarding school which closed shortly after the turn of the century. Some estate and early farmlands were donated to the Roman Catholic church and make up the current grounds of St Mary's of East Islip, which includes a private elementary and middle school, in addition to church and other parish buildings. The original Westbrook farm on the boundary between East Islip and Oakdale, near the Bayard Cutting Arboretum, has ceased operations, and its fields are now the home of East Islip Soccer, near the fields set aside for the Little League of the Islips.

Today, modern East Islip is composed of much smaller, yet affluent communities and few estates. Many of these newer communities were built on the land that was once part of former estates that were sold off, most notably the estate of Percy G. Williams. The Moorings, an opulent waterfront guard-gated private community, is one of the hamlet's premier neighborhoods. Other neighborhoods within the hamlet include Deer Run and Country Village as well as the Beecher Estates.

Geography
East Islip is located at  (40.731938, -73.185135).

East Islip borders four other hamlets: Islip is to the west, Islip Terrace is to the north, North Great River is to the northeast, and Great River is to the east. The Great South Bay is to the south. It is the home of an experimental shellfish hatchery operated by the Town of Islip, near the town-operated public beach on the bay.

Demographics

Demographics for the CDP
As of the census of 2000, there were 4,578 households, and 3,731 families residing in the CDP. The population density was 3,428.5 per square mile (1,322.5/km2). There were 4,661 housing units, at an average density of 1,135.1/sq mi (437.9/km2). The racial makeup of the CDP was 96.20% White, 3.89% Hispanic, 0.57% African American, 0.06% Native American, 1.41% Asian, 0.02% Pacific Islander, 0.96% from other races, and 0.78% from two or more races.

There were 4,578 households, out of which 42.9% had children under the age of 18 living with them, 68.0% were married couples living together, 10.0% had a female householder with no husband present, and 18.5% were non-families. 15.2% of all households were made up of individuals, and 7.3% had someone living alone who was 65 years of age or older. The average household size was 3.03 and the average family size was 3.38.

The population of the CDP was spread out, with 28.5% under the age of 18, 6.3% from 18 to 24, 32.3% from 25 to 44, 21.1% from 45 to 64, and 11.8% who were 65 years of age or older. The median age was 37 years. For every 100 females, there were 95.2 males. For every 100 females age 18 and over, there were 90.1 males.

The median income for a household in the CDP was $71,106, and the median income for a family was $77,593. Males had a median income of $51,554 versus $36,959 for females. The per capita income for the CDP was $27,356. About 2.8% of families and 3.7% of the population were below the poverty line, including 4.3% of those under age 18 and 4.0% of those age 65 or over.

Schools
The East Islip School District serves the families of East Islip, Great River and Islip Terrace, and current enrollment is in the vicinity of 3,500 students. Two of the district's four elementary schools (John F. Kennedy Elementary School and Timber Point Elementary School) are located in East Islip, south of Montauk Highway while the other two (Ruth C. Kinney Elementary School and Connetquot Elementary School) are located in Great RIver.

Water
East Islip is home to two public marinas and one private marina. Two additional marinas are operated in Great River within the grounds of the Timber Point Country Club, the site of East Islip's only golf course. East Islip continues its tradition of sports hunting and fishing, as its marinas are home to several annual fishing tournaments and its marshes continue to serve many duck and other water fowl hunters.

Notable people
 Margaret Becker, contemporary Christian singer
 Chris Beyrer, doctor and humanitarian
 Anthony Cumia, co-host of The Opie and Anthony Show; lived in East Islip in his youth
 Boomer Esiason, former NFL quarterback (Cincinnati Bengals, New York Jets, Arizona Cardinals)
 Tony Graffanino, former Major League Baseball infielder
 Henry B. Hollins, one-time partner of J. P. Morgan (resided at Meadow Farm, a  estate)
 Charles L. Lawrance, aircraft engineer, designed engine for Lindbergh's Spirit of St. Louis (resided on  waterfront estate which William Miller later developed into The Moorings; a subdivision of Meadow Farm)
 Ralph Macchio, actor, best known for appearing in the movie The Karate Kid (resided in East Islip as well as Dix Hills) 
 Tim Melia, goalkeeper for Sporting Kansas City
 Rohan Murphy, double-amputee paralympic athlete and motivational speaker
 Christopher Panzner, artist/writer/producer
 Rosanne Sorrentino, actress/singer (stage and film productions of Annie)
 Kathy Troccoli, contemporary Christian singer

References

Islip (town), New York
Census-designated places in New York (state)
Hamlets in New York (state)
Census-designated places in Suffolk County, New York
Hamlets in Suffolk County, New York
Populated coastal places in New York (state)